Rafita may refer to:

 Rafita, Spanish footballer
 1644 Rafita, a stony asteroid of the asteroid belt
 Rafita family, an asteroid of family